Lincoln is a 2012 American historical drama film directed and produced by Steven Spielberg, starring Daniel Day-Lewis as United States President Abraham Lincoln and Sally Field as Mary Todd Lincoln. The film is based in part on Doris Kearns Goodwin's biography of Lincoln, Team of Rivals: The Political Genius of Abraham Lincoln, and covers the final four months of Lincoln's life, focusing on the President's efforts in January 1865 to have the Thirteenth Amendment to the United States Constitution passed by the United States House of Representatives.

Lincoln premiered on October 8, 2012, at the New York Film Festival. The film was released on November 9, 2012, in select cities and widely released on November 16, 2012, in the United States by DreamWorks through Disney's Touchstone distribution label in the U.S. The film was released on January 25, 2013, in the United Kingdom, with distribution in international territories, including the U.K., by 20th Century Fox. The film received universal acclaim by critics and was nominated for 12 Academy Awards at the 85th ceremony, the most of any film released in 2012.

Awards and nominations

References

External links
 

Lists of accolades by film
Disney-related lists